Neyzar may refer to:

Neyzar, Kerman
Neyzar-e Olya, Khuzestan Province
Neyzar-e Sofla, Khuzestan Province
Neyzar, Qom
Neyzar, Mashhad, Razavi Khorasan Province
Neyzar Rural District, in Qom Province